Seal Island is located near Augusta, Western Australia in the South West region.

It is located just east of Cape Leeuwin, and lies closer to land than Saint Alouarn Island which lies further to the south.

 

It can be awash in severe weather. 
When viewed from beaches at sea level on adjacent coast, its height above sea level is negligible, however one map shows 9 metres maximum height of any part of the rock and its name was slightly altered in 1972, and 1979.

Murray and Hercock consider its naming was by Vancouver in 1791, however, it is located near a series of unmarked and barely detectable below surface rocks (the reason for the sinking of the SS Pericles in 1913), however the name was also recorded by Archdeacon in 1878.

References

St Alouarn Islands